Iyoite is a very rare manganese copper chloride hydroxide mineral with the formula MnCuCl(OH)3. Iyoite is a new member of the atacamite group, and it an analogue of botallackite characterized in manganese and copper ordering. Iyoite is monoclinic (space group P21/m). It is chemically similar to misakiite. Both minerals come from the Ohku mine in the Ehime prefecture, Japan.

References

Halide minerals
Manganese minerals
Copper minerals
Monoclinic minerals
Minerals in space group 11